Jonny Hill may refer to:

Jonny Hill (singer), Austrian pop singer
Jonny Hill (rugby union)

See also
Johnny Hill